Mortal Kombat: Onslaught is an upcoming action-adventure beat 'em up role-playing game, developed by NetherRealm Studios. It is scheduled to be released for mobile platforms in 2023. A spin-off of the Mortal Kombat franchise, it is the fourth installment to not be a fighting game and combines the combat gameplay with a full cinematic storyline, reminiscent of free-to-play mobile multiplayer online battle arena games. It began location testing on October 31, 2022.

Developer Ed Boon stated about the development of the game, "We are pushing the boundaries of Mortal Kombat to allow players to experience the franchise in new ways, while still staying true to its core visceral nature... With Mortal Kombat: Onslaught, we reimagined Mortal Kombat into a strategic team-based collection RPG with fast-paced, group melee combat that both new and existing fans can enjoy."

References

External links

Android (operating system) games
IOS games
Mortal Kombat games
Multiplayer and single-player video games
Role-playing video games
Upcoming video games scheduled for 2023
NetherRealm Studios games
Video games developed in the United States